Do That Again is a jazz album recorded by The Jazz Professors, a sextet led by tenor saxophonist Jeff Rupert. The album was recorded by the jazz faculty of the University of Central Florida and reached No. 6 on the JazzWeek chart.

Track listing

Personnel
 Jeff Rupert – saxophone
 Michael Wilkinson – trombone
 Bobby Koelble – guitar
 Richard Drexler – double bass
 Per Danielsson – piano
 Marty Morell – drums

References

2013 albums
Jazz albums by American artists